The Nick of Time Baby is a 1916 American silent comedy film directed by Clarence G. Badger and starring Gloria Swanson.

Cast
 Sylvia Ashton
 Robert Bolder (as Bobby Bolder)
 Helen Bray
 Teddy the Dog
 Tom Kennedy
 Larry Lyndon
 Earle Rodney
 Gloria Swanson
 Bobby Vernon as Bobby

References

External links

1916 films
1916 short films
American silent short films
American black-and-white films
1916 comedy films
Films directed by Clarence G. Badger
Films produced by Mack Sennett
Keystone Studios films
Triangle Film Corporation films
Silent American comedy films
American comedy short films
1910s American films